Mondesa is a suburb of Swakopmund in central western Namibia. The district is located in the northeast of the city. In the northwest, it borders on the district Tamariskia, in the south on the industrial area. Otherwise, Mondesa is surrounded by the Namib Desert, with the Democratic Resettlement Community (DRC) spreading out about one kilometre apart in the northeast, officially acclaimed in 2003 by the city administration slum district of Swakopmund. Originally Mondesa was a township for the Black people of Swakopmund. It is also the fastest-growing district with an ever-growing population. In 2017 the Swakopmund municipality erected a wall obstructing the view on the township for people entering town. The Namibian, Namibia's largest English newspaper, called it a "Wall of shame".

See also
 Vineta (Swakopmund)

References

Swakopmund
Shanty towns in Namibia